Ebalzotan (NAE-086) is a selective 5-HT1A receptor agonist. It was under development as an antidepressant and anxiolytic agent but produced undesirable side effects in phase I clinical trials and was subsequently discontinued.

See also 
 4-HO-PiPT
 Robalzotan

References 

Amines
Carboxamides
Chromanes
Isopropylamino compounds